National Highway 143 (Previously NH23) is a national highway of India. This highway runs from Gumla in the state of Jharkhand to Barkote in Odisha.This is a daily communication road to Bhubaneswar from Raurkela. it is also known as Ranchi road. 

Land acquisition on the 130km of NH143 is in progress which will connect Barkote & Biramitrapur.

Route

References  

National highways in India
National Highways in Jharkhand
National Highways in Odisha